Safonovsky (masculine), Safonovskaya (feminine), or Safonovskoye (neuter) may refer to:
Safonovsky District, a district of Smolensk Oblast, Russia
Safonovskoye Urban Settlement, an administrative division and a municipal formation which the town of Safonovo in Safonovsky District of Smolensk Oblast, Russia is incorporated as
Safonovsky (rural locality) (Safonovskaya, Safonovskoye), several rural localities in Russia